Social Democratic Action of Croatia ( or ASH) was a Croatian left-wing political party.

It was founded by 1994 by members of Social Democratic Party of Croatia dissatisfied with the centrist policies of SDP leader Ivica Račan and his lack of criticism towards Franjo Tuđman.

The party had high hopes of gathering support beyond disenchanted SDP voters after Croatian Spring leader Miko Tripalo left Croatian People's Party in order to join them. 
In 1994, they tried to force an all-left party coalition in Croatia for the upcoming elections. The idea was rejected by Ivica Račan and SDP so they failed to realise it.

In the 1995 parliamentary election most of left-wing voters opted for SDP while ASH managed to get only one seat (Milorad Pupovac, 5th special district).

Alongside the party presidents, ASH had prominent members such as Vjeran Zuppa (prominent left-wing intellectual and dramaturge) and Tomislav Jakić  (former journalist, TV reporter and advisor to president Stjepan Mesić).

In 2009, the party's membership was 6,300.

Presidents

Miko Tripalo (1994–1996)
Silvije Degen (1996–2001)
Zlatko Klarić (2001–2016)

Electoral history

Legislative

European Parliament

References

External links
Official website 

Political parties established in 1994
Social democratic parties in Croatia
1994 establishments in Croatia